The 1938–39 Divizia B was the fifth season of the second tier of the Romanian football league system.

The format has been changed, from two series of 12 teams to four regional series of 10 teams. The winners of the series played a promotion play-off and only the first three places promoted to Divizia A.

Team changes

To Divizia B
Promoted from Divizia C
 IS Câmpia Turzii
 Turda București
 Mociornița Colțea București
 Minerul Lupeni
 Monopol Târgu Mureș
 Traian Tighina
 Mihai Viteazul Chișinău

Relegated from Divizia A
 Unirea Tricolor București
 Universitatea Cluj
 CA Oradea
 Vulturii Textila Lugoj
 Jiul Petroșani
 Crișana Oradea
 CFR Brașov
 Dacia Unirea Brăila
 Olimpia CFR Satu Mare
 Dragoș Vodă Cernăuți

From Divizia B
Relegated to Divizia C
 —

Promoted to Divizia A
 Tricolor Ploiești
 UD Reșița

Renamed teams
Victoria Constanța was renamed as AS Constanța.

Enrolled teams
Victoria CFR Iași and Luceafărul București were enrolled in Divizia B.

Disqualified teams
Telefon Club București withdrew from Divizia B.

League tables

South–East

North–East

South–West

North–West

Promotion play-off 
Winners of the series played a promotion play-off to decide the first three team which promoted to Divizia A.

Round 1 

|-
||4–1||0–1
||2–2||0–0
|}

Round 2 

|}

Round 3 

|-
||4–1||0–2
|}

Notes:
 CAM Timișoara, Unirea Tricolor București and Gloria CFR Galați promoted to 1939–40 Divizia A.

See also 

 1938–39 Divizia A

References

Liga II seasons
Romania
2